Dino Marcan and Antonio Šančić are the defending champions.

Seeds

Draw

References
 Main Draw

Banja Luka Challenger - Doubles
2015 Doubles
2015 in Bosnia and Herzegovina